Girls of Paris (French: Jeunes filles de Paris) is a 1936 French film directed by Claude Vermorel and starring Michel Simon, Mireille Balin and Paul Azaïs.

Cast
 Michel Simon as Baron de Beaupoil and his brother  
 Mireille Balin as Gine  
 Paul Azaïs as Henri Maubert  
 Nadia Sibirskaïa as Andrée Maubert  
 Raymond Cordy as Emile le Taxi 
 Maurice Baquet as Gaston  
 Mady Berry as Madame Maubert  
  as Le vieux monsieur 
 Jean Darcante as Roland  
 Renée Dargent as Mimi  
 Aline Debray 
 Marcel Delaître as Maubert 
  as Jacques  
 Gilbert Gil as Georges Levaut  
  as Madame Levaut  
 Léon Larive
 Marguerite Moreno as La baronne de Beaupoil 
 Françoise Morhange as Jeannette Maubert  
 Palau as Levaut - le pharmacien  
 André Roanne as Jo  
 Gabrielle Roanne

References

Bibliography 
 Crisp, Colin. Genre, Myth and Convention in the French Cinema, 1929-1939. Indiana University Press, 2002.

External links 
 

1936 films
1930s French-language films
French comedy-drama films
1936 comedy-drama films
French black-and-white films
1930s French films